Kristóf Herjeczki (born 23 June 1998) is a Hungarian football player who currently plays for Gyirmót.

Career

Budapest Honvéd
On 15 July 2017, Herjeczki played his first match for Budapest Honvéd in a 2-0 win against Szombathelyi Haladás in the Hungarian League.

Club statistics

Updated to games played as of 15 May 2022.

References

External links
 
 

1998 births
Living people
Footballers from Budapest
Hungarian footballers
Hungary youth international footballers
Association football forwards
Budapest Honvéd FC players
Budapest Honvéd FC II players
Nemzeti Bajnokság I players
Gyirmót FC Győr players
Nemzeti Bajnokság II players